The City of Sandringham was a local government area about  south of Melbourne, the state capital of Victoria, Australia, on the eastern side of Port Phillip.

History

Sandringham was originally part of the Shire of Moorabbin, and was severed and incorporated as the Borough of Sandringham on 28 February 1917. It was proclaimed a town on 9 April 1919, and a city on 21 March 1923.

On 15 December 1994, the City of Sandringham was abolished, and along with the City of Brighton and parts of the City of Moorabbin, plus the eastern section of Beaumaris from the City of Mordialloc, was merged into the newly created City of Bayside.

Council meetings were held at the Municipal Offices, on Royal Avenue, Sandringham. It presently serves as a corporate centre for the City of Bayside.

Wards

The City of Sandringham was subdivided into three wards on 15 September 1970, each electing three councillors:
 North Ward
 Centre Ward
 South Ward

Suburbs
 Beaumaris (shared with the City of Moorabbin and the City of Mordialloc)
 Black Rock
 Cheltenham (shared with the City of Moorabbin)
 Hampton
 Sandringham*

* Council seat.

Former Mayors

Population

* Estimate in the 1958 Victorian Year Book.

References

External links
 Victorian Places - Sandringham

Sandringham
City of Bayside
1994 disestablishments in Australia
1917 establishments in Australia